Williamstown is a small village located on the R360 regional road in the townland of Corralough in northeast County Galway, Ireland. According to the census in April 2016, the population of the village was 148.

Founded in the 1830s, the village of Williamstown takes its name from William McDermott, a local landlord and barrister who owned the nearby Springfield estate.

Williamstown GAA fields an Intermediate and Junior Gaelic football team as well as various underage teams. The Intermediate team were promoted from Junior A in 2006. Irish dancing groups and the Williamstown Scouts hold meetings in the parish hall that is also used as the playschool. The town's national school (primary school) is Sacred Heart National School.

Williamstown hosts an annual festival in August. It includes treasure hunts, sports days, and other activities.

See also
List of towns and villages in Ireland

References

Towns and villages in County Galway